Kent, the Fighting Man is a 1916 British silent sports film directed by A. E. Coleby and starring Billy Wells, Hetty Payne and Arthur Rooke. It was based on a novel by George Edgar.

Cast

 Billy Wells ...  John Westerley
 Hetty Payne ...  Constance 
 A. E. Coleby ...  Adams 
 Arthur Rooke ...  Honorable Jimmy Greenback 
 Frank Dane ...  Brother 
 Nelson Phillips ...  Col. Rapton 
 Harry Lofting ...  Jim Dace 
 Fred Drummond ...  Button 
 Tom Coventry ...  Clown

References

External links

1916 films
British boxing films
Films directed by A. E. Coleby
Films based on American novels
British silent feature films
British black-and-white films
1910s sports films
1910s English-language films
1910s British films
Silent sports films